Vishwamali, commonly known as Mali, is a female Asian elephant which is best known for being a major attraction of Manila Zoo in Manila, Philippines.

Early life
Vishwamali, nicknamed Mali, was in Sri Lanka in 1974. Mali is a female Asian elephant (Elephas maximus). She was moved into the Pinnawala Elephant Orphanage after her mother died of natural causes. In 1977, when Mali was three years old, the Sri Lankan government gifted the elephant to then Philippine First Lady Imelda Marcos. The elephant was presented at the Malacañang Palace prior to her transfer to Manila Zoo.

Captivity at Manila Zoo

When Mali was moved to Manila Zoo, she was placed in an enclosure with another female elephant named Shiba. Shiba, who was rescued from a circus, was territorial and behaved aggressively towards Mali. Following Shiba's death, Mali was able to roam around her enclosure more freely.

Treatment and condition

Mali's condition has been a subject of concern by various animal welfare groups.

Mali has been part of a campaign led by People for the Ethical Treatment of Animals (PETA) alleging the elephant is subject to neglect and has been urging for the release of the elephant. PETA has campaigned for the move of Mali to an elephant to a sanctuary in Thailand, but there are concerns that the elephant may not be able to adapt to a new environment if moved out of the Manila Zoo. PETA alternatively had proposed Mali to be moved to the Elephant Sanctuary in the United States. The Network for Animals (NFA), which maintains a stance against zoos in general, makes an exception for Mali. Despite its stance, the NFA expressed in 2018 that Manila Zoo is "the best option" in Mali's case.

There are also contrary reports which suggest Mali is healthy. In 2013, Mali underwent a checkup in a lead up to a potential transfer to Thailand. Nikorn Thongtip of Kasetsart University remarked that Mali is "healthy in every system" although exhibited "a little bit obesity". Thongtip remarked that the elephant's nails "do not look bad, compared to elephants of the same age". Although Thongtip has said that Mali had to be tested for tuberculosis, before it could be moved to Thailand. In 2018, results of blood test conducted on Mali, suggests the elephant is healthy, although the animal is still remarked to be overweight and is under a diet plan.

See also
 List of individual elephants

References

Individual elephants
1974 animal births
Individual animals in the Philippines
History of Manila
Controversies in the Philippines
Philippines–Sri Lanka relations